Nilam Devi, also Neelam Devi (born 1973), is an Indian politician representing Mokama assembly constituency in the Bihar Legislative Assembly.

She was elected as a member of the Bihar Legislative Assembly in 2022 by-election, after disqualification of her predecessor (and also her husband) Anant Kumar Singh as an MLA. She contested the election through the political party Rashtriya Janta Dal.

She earlier fought from Munger Lok Sabha constituency in 2019 representing the national party Indian National Congress.

Personal life 
Neelam Devi is married to Anant Kumar Singh. She is educated up to class 8, and has four children.

References 

Bihar MLAs 2020–2025
People from Patna district
Living people
Rashtriya Janata Dal politicians
Former members of Indian National Congress
1973 births